Love Takes Over is the live album from Soul Survivor. Integrity Music released the album on 13 November 2015.

Critical reception

Giving the album an eight out of ten at Cross Rhythms, Matt McChlery says, "recommended." Jono Davies, rating the album five stars for Louder Than the music, writes, "the worship sounds...ringing out is captured beautifully on this recording." Awarding the album four stars from 365 Days of Inspiring Media, Jonathan Andre states, "such an awe-inspiring and compelling set of 11 tracks!"

Track listing

Chart performance

References

2015 live albums